Charles Farwell may refer to:

 Charles B. Farwell (1823–1903), U.S. Representative and Senator from Illinois
 Charles Franklin Farwell (1860–?), Ontario lawyer and political figure